Johann Friedrich Mayer may refer to:

 Johann Friedrich Mayer (theologian) (1650–1712), German theologian
 Johann Friedrich Mayer (agriculturist) (1719–1798), German agriculturist